"O-o-h Child" is a 1970 single, written by Stan Vincent, recorded by Chicago soul family group the Five Stairsteps and released on the Buddah label. 

The Five Stairsteps had previous peripheral success recording in Chicago with Curtis Mayfield; when Mayfield's workload precluded his continuing to work with the group they were reassigned to Stan Vincent, an in-house producer for Buddah Records, who had recently scored a Top Ten hit with the Lou Christie single "I'm Gonna Make You Mine". The Five Stairsteps' debut collaboration with Vincent was originally formatted with the group's rendition of "Dear Prudence" as the A-side with Vincent's original composition "O-o-h Child" as B-side. However, "O-o-h Child" broke out in the key markets of Philadelphia and Detroit to rise as high as #8 on the Billboard Hot 100 in the summer of 1970.

The track's R&B chart impact was more muted with a #14 peak, although "O-o-h Child" is now regarded as a "soft soul" classic. Billboard ranked the record as the No. 21 song of 1970.

Song information
The Five Stairsteps' only pop Top 40 hit, "O-o-h Child" would be the group's last R&B top 40 hit (they had several top 40 R&B hits in the 1960s) until 1976's "From Us to You". Included on the band's The Stairsteps album from 1970, it has become the Stairsteps' signature song and has inspired more than twenty covers since its release. The song featured various members, including lone female member and eldest sister Alohe, brothers Keni, Dennis, James, lead singer Clarence Burke Jr. singing in various parts of the song.

The lyrics tell the listener that "things are gonna get easier" in times of strife. The song's uplifting message helped it to become popular among pop and rhythm and blues audiences when it was released.

The song is ranked #402 on the Rolling Stone magazine's list of The 500 Greatest Songs of All Time.

Critical reception
AllMusic review by Joe Viglione: "Producer Stan Vincent's Top Ten hit for the Stairsteps, "O-o-h Child," was one of those bright, memorable, sterling songs which, as with Alive 'N Kickin's "Tighter, Tighter," made the summer of 1970 so memorable."

Personnel

The Five Stairsteps
Lead vocals by Alohe Burke, Clarence Burke Jr., Keni Burke
Backing vocals by James Burke, Dennis Burke

Musicians 
Guitars by Hugh McCracken and Clarence Burke Jr.
Bass by Keni Burke
Keyboards by Richard Tee
Drums by Bernard Purdie

Production
Recorded at Allegro Studios 
Produced, written, arranged, and conducted by Stan Vincent

Charts

Weekly charts

Year-end charts

Certifications

Cover versions

 The Spinners covered the song on their 1970 album 2nd Time Around.
 Bruce Ruffin released a reggae cover of the song in 1970.
 Nina Simone covered the song on her 1971 album Here Comes the Sun.
 Dusty Springfield covered the song in 1971 for possible inclusion on See All Her Faces. It was finally released in 2001 on the posthumous compilation Love Songs.
 The New Birth covered the song on their 1971 album, Ain't No Big Thing, But It's Growing.
 The Edwin Hawkins Singers recorded this song for their 1973 release I'd Like To Teach the World To Sing, also on the Buddah label.
 Richie Havens covered the song on his 1974 album Mixed Bag II.
 Dee Dee Sharp covered the song on her 1975 album Happy 'bout The Whole Thing.
 Valerie Carter covered the song for her 1977 release Just a Stone's Throw Away.
 Mary Wilson from The Supremes covered the song in 1989, and released it as a single.
 Dino's version hit #27 on the Billboard Hot 100 in 1993.
 BeBe & CeCe Winans covered the song on their 1993 Christmas album First Christmas.
 Wondermints covered the song on their 1996 album Wonderful World of the Wondermints.
 Milton Nascimento covered the song on his 1999 album "Crooner". 
 Beth Orton covered the song on her 2003 compilation album The Other Side of Daybreak as a soft, acoustic guitar version. The song was featured on the pilot episode "First Responders" of The Unit, on an episode of Alias entitled "Repercussions", on an episode in Ally McBeal entitled "Love Unlimited", sung by Calista Flockhart, Jesse L. Martin, Lisa Nicole Carson and Vonda Shepard, on an episode of Life entitled "Serious Control Issues", on a CSI: NY episode entitled "Unusual Suspects", on a Cold Case episode entitled "Superstar", on a ER episode entitled "Graduation Day", on a The Good Doctor entitled "Dr. Ted", at the end of the Hawaii Five-0 episode "Hahai I Na Pilikua Nui".
 Molly Johnson recorded the medley "Ooh Child"/ "Redemption Song" for her 2002 album Another Day.
 In its 2002 CD release the 1971 album Gonna Take a Miracle by Laura Nyro was augmented by four live tracks from Nyro's May 30, 1971 concert at Fillmore East including "Ooh Child" with the entire concert being issued in 2004 as Spread Your Wings and Fly: Live at the Fillmore East.
 Kelly Rowland recorded a live version of the song in Rotterdam, the Netherlands which was released in 2003 on the Destiny's Child World Tour DVD.
 Nancy Wilson and Ramsey Lewis remade the song for their 2003 collaborative album Simple Pleasures.
 Hall & Oates covered the song on their 2004 album Our Kind of Soul.
 Donnie McClurkin covered the song featuring Kirk Franklin on his 2004 album Psalms, Hymns and Spiritual Songs and his version was also on the soundtrack of the 2005 film The Gospel, starring Boris Kodjoe.
 Trey Anastasio has covered this song live in concert numerous times, including on Late Night with Jimmy Fallon on October 30, 2012.
 The song was covered by Raya Yarbrough and Bear McCreary in "The Devil in the Dark", Episode 3 Season 1, of the TV show Defiance.  The show was first aired April 29, 2013, and is contained on the accompanying soundtrack album to the series.
 Christine Anu covered the song on her album Island Christmas (2014).
 Vulfpeck debuted a cover of the song at the Brooklyn Bowl, with lead vocals from Antwaun Stanley (2016).
 Janet Jackson sampled the song in her song "Truth" from her All For You album in 2001.
 Lisa Loeb covered the song on the 2017 album Lullaby Girl.
 MILCK covered the song on her 2018 album This Is Not the End.
 Kamasi Washington covered the song on the 2018 EP The Choice.
 Jill Sobule covered the song on the 2018 album Nostalgia Kills.
The Quiet Loud (formerly The Show) covered the song in 2018. The song was unreleased until 2020, when the band made it available to radio and for download as a fundraising song for their hometown Pittsburgh music venues during the COVID19 Pandemic. 
 Paul Stanley's Soul Station covered the song on the 2021 album Now and Then.

In popular culture

 In the 1979 film Over the Edge, the closing scene (while the prison bus drives away) is underscored by the Valerie Carter version.
 "O-o-h Child" was featured prominently in a notable scene of the 1991 film Boyz n the Hood, when Doughboy and Chris are witnessed being arrested by Tre and Furious.
 The song is played in the 1994 film Crooklyn when the main character Troy Carmichael attends the funeral of her mother with the entire family. 
 The Beastie Boys song "Intergalactic" contains the lyrics "It always brings me back when I hear O-o-h Child".
 In the 2000 film Our Song, "O-o-h Child" is the song referred to in the title.
 In a 2000 episode of Boy Meets World entitled "Angela's Ashes" Eric sings the refrain to Angela.
 The 2004 animated film Shark Tale played the song during Oscar's flashback sequence about his father.
 In a 2005 episode of TV series Judging Amy entitled "You Don't Know Me" (Season 6, Episode 12).
 In the film Bridge to Terabithia, music teacher Ms. Edmunds sings the song accompanied by her class.
 In the TV show How I Met Your Mother, Season 3, episode 11, "The Platinum Rule".
 In 2011 a few lines of the song were sung in the US Sitcom Mike & Molly (Season 2 Episode 12).
 On December 5, 2011, "O-o-h Child" was covered in a cappella by Sing-Off Season 2 champion Committed and Season 3 Runner-Up Afro-Blue in the show's Sing-Off Christmas.
 In TV show The Bernie Mac Show, Season 1, episode 1, "Pilot".
 In "A Tree Grows in Springfield", the sixth episode of season 24 of The Simpsons
 In "The Devil in the Dark", the third episode of season 1 of Defiance, performed by Raya Yarbrough, originally aired April 29, 2013, the song underscores the final scenes.
 In Grand Theft Auto V on the in-game radio station The Lowdown 91.1.
 In Saturday Night Live Season 39 episode 15, a GPS navigation device keeps interrupting Lena Dunham during a car sing-along of the song.
 In the 2014 Marvel film Guardians of the Galaxy, Peter Quill sings the song while performing a dance-off to distract Ronan the Accuser.
 In the TV show Scandal, Season 4, episode 15 "The Testimony of Diego Muñoz".
 In the TV show CSI: NY, Season 6, Episode 21 "Unusual Suspects".
 In the TV show iZombie, the song plays on the radio during season 2, episode 19 "Salivation Army".
 In episode 8 of the TV miniseries The People v. O.J. Simpson: American Crime Story, Johnnie Cochran (played by Courtney B. Vance) sings the first verses of the song while celebrating a courtroom victory.
 It was heard, in edited form, during the pregame show of Super Bowl LI on February 5, 2017, in a film about college football players from HBCUs who have been inducted to the Pro Football Hall of Fame.
 The song was part of the 'Love Over Bias' campaign for Procter & Gamble advertised globally during the 2018 Winter Olympics.
 The song was used during the 2020 Democratic National Convention while Joe and Jill Biden told the story of their early relationship.
 In 2021, a cover of the song by Anne-Marie was used in a series of television adverts for O2 in the United Kingdom.

Sampled

The song is sampled throughout the 1993 song "Getting Brighter" by the Dynamic Twins.
 The song's chorus is used in the 1993 2Pac song "Keep Ya Head Up".
R. Kelly quoted the song on the remix of the 1994 hit "Bump n' Grind".
 It is sampled in UK grime artist Shystie's song "Somedayz" from the album Diamond in the Dirt.
 Janet Jackson interpolated this song on her 2001 song "Truth".
 Joe used this in the intro of his 2001 song "Better Days".
 It is sampled in UK grime artist Bashy's 2007 song "Black Boys".
 Hi-Rez interpolated this song on his 2011 song "Ooh Child".
 The song's chorus was used by rapper Z-Ro in the song "Lord Tell Me Why", on his 1998 debut album Look What You Did to Me. He used the chorus again in 2000, on the song "Gonna Get Easier".
 In January 2017 the hook from the song was sampled for the song "Hurricane Of Diamonds" released by Psychopathic Records featuring Insane Clown Posse, Anybody Killa, Big Hoodoo, DJ Clay, Blahzay Roze and Lyte.

See also
 List of 1970s one-hit wonders in the United States

References

External links
 The Five Stairsteps, 'O-o-h Child' - 500 GREATEST SONGS OF ALL TIME
 Over the Edge - Soundtrack
 

1970 songs
1970 singles
American soul songs
Five Stairsteps songs
Buddah Records singles